Duvashen Padayachee is an Australian racing driver.

Career

Beginnings
Padayachee began his career in racing in 2010, competing in the Pacific Formula BMW. With the achievements of 49 points ranked 11 th in the overall standings. A year later, the JK Racing Asia Series was fifth. In 2011 he started well in the Radical Australia Cup, where, however, was not classified.

Formula Renault 2.0
In addition to competing in Formula Ford Geoff started in 2011, also in British Formula Renault. The main series of 19 points gave him 16 position in the overall standings, and the final round was the thirteenth.

Formula 3
For the 2012 season the Australian has signed a contract with the Finnish team Double R Racing to compete in the International Series British Formula 3 and European Formula 3. Only in the British edition it was classified. In the classroom National won there six races and 21 podium finishes. This allowed him to win the title wicemistrzowski class nation.

Porsche
In 2013 Duvashen moved to the Australian Porsche Carrera Cup, joining Team BRM.

Statistics

† – Padayachee was ineligible to score points.

External links
 

1990 births
Living people
Australian racing drivers
Formula BMW Pacific drivers
British Formula Three Championship drivers
Eurasia Motorsport drivers
Double R Racing drivers
Australian Endurance Championship drivers